Charlotte Carey (born 11 June 1996) is a Welsh table tennis player. Her highest career ITTF ranking was 98 in 2018.

Carey comes from Ebbw Vale and attended Glyncoed Comprehensive School. began playing in 2006 and trained at the Sport Wales National Centre in Cardiff. At the 2010 Commonwealth Games in Delhi, aged 14, Carey was the youngest member of the team selected to compete for Wales. In 2013, her career progressed with two bronze medals at the European Youth Championships and in the same year she won two gold medals on the Maltese TTF Global Junior Circuit. At the 2014 Commonwealth Games in Glasgow, she was defeated in the second round of the Women's Singles, and in the third round of the Women's Doubles, with Naomi Owen as her partner. In the team competition at the same games, she was part of the Welsh team that was defeated in the quarter finals.

At the 2022 Commonwealth Games in Birmingham, Carey and her partner Anna Hursey won the bronze medal in the Women's Singles competition.

References

External links
 
 

1996 births
Living people
Welsh female table tennis players
20th-century Welsh people
Sportspeople from Ebbw Vale